Cho Gab-je (born, 24 October 1945) is a conservative South Korean journalist and entrepreneur. He was born in Saitama Prefecture, Japan in 1945 and raised in Busan, South Korea. Jo served as the chief editor and president of Monthly Chosun. He authored several books including "Spit on my grave", a biography of the former president, Park Chung-hee which was originally published in Monthly Chosun.

Awards
 1974, the 7th Korean Journalist Award - Traces of heavy metal pollution
 1990, Magazine Writer Award
 1991, the 4th Asia-Pacific Special Award
 1994, Kwan Hoon club Journalist Award

See also
 Park Chung-hee
 Seungman Rhee
 Kim Gu
 Ji Man-Won
 Sunwoo Hwi
 Jin Jung Gwon

References

External links 
 

South Korean journalists
1945 births
Living people
South Korean anti-communists
Busan High School alumni